The Faculty of Public Health (FPH) is a public health association in the United Kingdom established as a registered charity. It is the standard setting body for public health specialists within the United Kingdom, setting standards for training, examination, and specialist practice across the four countries of the UK. It is also a source of knowledge and guidance around public health, and advocates for public health nationally and globally.

The current president is Professor Kevin Fenton CBE, who took office in July 2022 for a three-year term.

History
The Faculty of Public Health (formerly the Faculty of Community Medicine and then the Faculty of Public Health Medicine) was formed in 1972 as a result of a key recommendation of the Royal Commission on Medical Education (1965–68). It was set up as a joint, autonomous faculty by the three Royal Colleges of Physicians of the United Kingdom (London, Edinburgh and Glasgow).

Stated purpose
FPH states its mission as:

As the professional membership body for public health we will work to promote and protect human health and its wider determinants for everyone in society by:

 Playing a leading role in assuring an effective public health workforce.
 Promoting public health knowledge.
 Advocating for the reduction of inequalities and for the very best conditions for health and wellbeing to flourish.

Membership
FPH has a paid membership of around 4,000 in several classes:
Fellows (FFPH) (formerly FFPHM)
Members (MFPH)
Specialty Registrar Members
Diplomate Members (DFPH)
International Practitioner
Practitioner Members
Associate Members
Student Members

Education and Training 
The Faculty of Public Health (FPH) is responsible for overseeing the quality of training and professional development of public health consultants in the UK. They set and maintain the professional standards in the discipline.

Policy and Advocacy 
The Faculty of Public Health works to improve the public’s health and wellbeing by working collaboratively with their 4,000 members to encourage them to share, discuss, and develop various projects and elements of policy and best practice.

Much of the Faculty's policy work is guided by their Special Interest Groups that are overseen by their policy committees.

Affiliations
FPH is a registered charity and an official supporting organisation of HIFA2015 (Healthcare Information For All by 2015).

FPH is a member of the Academy of Medical Royal Colleges

FPH is a member of the World Federation of Public Health Associations.

Prizes and awards
FPH has a number of prizes and awards which identify and highlight excellence in public health practice.

Alwyn Smith Prize
The Alwyn Smith Prize is a discretionary prize awarded annually "to the FPH member or fellow judged to have made the most outstanding contribution to the health of the public by either research or practice in community medicine (public health medicine)."

Bazalgette Professorship 
The Bazalgette Professorship recognises a Fellow of FPH for major contributions to public health policy and/or practice through research translation for the benefit of UK population health.

References

External links

Health in the London Borough of Camden
Learned societies of the United Kingdom
Medical associations based in the United Kingdom
Organisations based in the London Borough of Camden
Public health in the United Kingdom
Public Health